Naloxonazine is a potent, irreversible μ-opioid receptor antagonist. Naloxonazine forms spontaneously in acidic solutions of naloxazone, and may be responsible for much or all of the irreversible μ opioid receptor binding displayed by the latter.

See also
 Oxymorphone-3-methoxynaltrexonazine, a similar opioid also having two complete and mirrored morphinan carbon skeletons

References

4,5-Epoxymorphinans
Mu-opioid receptor antagonists
Phenols
Allyl compounds
Semisynthetic opioids
Alkylating agents
Irreversible antagonists